David Simbo (born 28 September 1989) is a Sierra Leonean professional footballer who plays as a defender for I-League club NEROCA.

Club career
Born in Freetown, Simbo started his career playing for Mighty Blackpool in his home country. In 2009, he went to Norway to play for third-tier side Raufoss. While at the Norwegian club, he sought political asylum in the country using the name Mohamed Sesay. After his successful first season in Norway, he was signed by second-tier club Sogndal; however, because his asylum request was denied due to him using two different names, he was unable to return to Norway to play for them.

Simbo returned to Sierra Leone to play for Mighty Blackpool. In 2011, he went on loan to Swedish third-tier club Motala for the first half of the season, and then Allsvenskan club Trelleborg for the second half of the season.

He spent the 2012 season with Boden.

In 2013, he signed for Sandviken.

He signed for Saudi club Najran SC in July 2015. He then played for Krumkachy Minsk.

He later played in Turkey for Yeni Amasyaspor, and Kurtuluşspor. He spent the 2018–19 season with Adana Kiremithanespor.

He then played for Iraqi club Al-Zawraa. In September 2019, he moved to North Cyprus to play for Baf Ulku Yurdu FC.

In February 2022, Simbo moved to India after signing with I-League defending champions Gokulam Kerala.

He moved to NEROCA in August 2022.

International career
He made his international debut for Sierra Leone against Egypt in their 1–1 draw in 2010.

Honours
Al-Hilal Omdurman
Sudan Premier League: 2014
Gokulam Kerala
I-League: 2021–22

References

External links

1989 births
Living people
Sierra Leonean footballers
Sierra Leone international footballers
Sierra Leonean expatriate footballers
Expatriate footballers in Norway
Expatriate footballers in Sweden
Expatriate footballers in Sudan
Expatriate footballers in Saudi Arabia
Expatriate footballers in Belarus
Expatriate footballers in Turkey
Expatriate footballers in Iraq
Sierra Leonean expatriate sportspeople in Norway
Sierra Leonean expatriate sportspeople in Sweden
Sierra Leonean expatriate sportspeople in Sudan
Sierra Leonean expatriate sportspeople in Saudi Arabia
Sierra Leonean expatriate sportspeople in Belarus
Sierra Leonean expatriate sportspeople in Turkey
Sierra Leonean expatriates in Iraq
Mighty Blackpool players
Raufoss IL players
Motala AIF players
Trelleborgs FF players
Bodens BK players
Sandvikens IF players
Al-Hilal Club (Omdurman) players
Najran SC players
FC Krumkachy Minsk players
Saudi Professional League players
Association football midfielders
Al-Zawraa SC players
Expatriate footballers in Northern Cyprus
Gokulam Kerala FC players
Expatriate footballers in India
Sierra Leonean expatriates in India
NEROCA FC players